Leonard Dannett (by 1530 – 1591) was an English politician.

He was a Member (MP) of the Parliament of England for Gatton in March 1553 and Marlborough in 1563.

References

1591 deaths
English MPs 1553 (Edward VI)
English MPs 1563–1567
Year of birth uncertain